Admiral Dundas may refer to:

George Dundas (Royal Navy officer) (1778–1834), British Royal Navy rear admiral
James Whitley Deans Dundas (1785–1862), British Royal Navy admiral
John Dundas (Royal Navy officer) (1893–1952), British Royal Navy vice admiral
Richard Saunders Dundas (1802–1861), British Royal Navy vice admiral
Thomas Dundas (Royal Navy officer) (c. 1765–1841), British Royal Navy vice admiral